The San Miguel Stakes was American Thoroughbred horse race run between 1956 and 2009 at Santa Anita Park in Arcadia, California. A race for three-year-olds, it was contested on dirt until its final two years when the synthetic Cushion Track was installed. It was raced at a distance of 7 furlongs in its 1956 inaugural then at 6 furlongs in 1957 and at 6.5 furlongs from 1958 through 1963 after which it reverted permanently to six furlongs.

Tompion came in third, and T.V. Lark placed in 1960.  Linda's Chief won and Ancient Title placed in 1973.  Bold Forbes placed in 1976.  A filly, Motivity, won in 1981.  Precisionist won in 1984.

The final running of the San Miguel Stakes took place on March 28, 2009.

Records
Speed record:
 1:08.22 @ 6 furlongs : Prince Wild (1991)

Most wins by a jockey:
 6 - Bill Shoemaker (1960, 1964, 1966, 1971, 1977, 1980)

Most wins by a trainer:
 3 - Ross Fenstermaker (1979, 1981, 1984)
 3 - D. Wayne Lukas (1996, 1999, 2005)
 3 - Bob Baffert (2002, 2006, 2007)

Most wins by an owner:
 4 - Fred W. Hooper (1962, 1979, 1981, 1984)

Winners

 † In 1985 the race was run in January and again in December.

References

Discontinued horse races
Flat horse races for three-year-olds
Open sprint category horse races
Horse races in California
Santa Anita Park
Previously graded stakes races in the United States
Recurring sporting events established in 1956
Recurring sporting events disestablished in 2009